Juuso is a given name and a surname, which was derived from the Biblical name of Joseph. Juuso's name day is March 19. Notable people with the name include:

Persons with the given name
Juuso Akkanen (born 1983), Finnish ice hockey player
Juuso Antonen, Finnish ice hockey player
Juuso Hietanen (born 1985), Finnish ice hockey defenceman
Juuso Honka (born 1990), Finnish ice hockey player
Juuso Ikonen (born 1995), Finnish ice hockey player
Juuso Kaijomaa, Finnish ice hockey player
Juuso Kangaskorpi (born 1975), Finnish football defender and manager
Juuso Ngaikukwete, Namibian  pastor
Juuso Pulli (born 1991), Finnish ice hockey defenceman
Juuso Puustinen (born 1988), Finnish ice hockey player
Juuso Pykälistö (born 1975), Finnish rally driver
Juuso Rajala (born 1988), Finnish ice hockey player
Juuso Ramo (born 1994), Finnish ice hockey player
Juuso Riikola (born 1993), Finnish ice hockey player
Juuso Riksman (born 1977), Finnish ice hockey goaltender
Juuso Salmi (born 1991), Finnish ice hockey defenceman
Juuso Simpanen (born 1991), Finnish footballer
Juuso Vainio (born 1994), Finnish ice hockey player
Juuso Walden (1907–1972), Finnish industrial entrepreneur

Persons with the surname
Anni-Kristiina Juuso (born 1979), Finnish actress
Inga Juuso (1945–2014), Norwegian yoik singer and actress
Kaisa Juuso, Finnish politician
Per Isak Juuso (born 1953), Sámi duojare and artist, Sweden

See also

Finnish-language surnames
Finnish masculine given names